The 1999–2000 Ligue 1 season (then called Division 1) was the 62nd since its establishment. AS Monaco won the French Association Football League with 65 points.

Participating teams

 Auxerre
 Bastia
 Bordeaux
 Le Havre
 RC Lens
 Olympique Lyonnais
 Olympique de Marseille
 FC Metz
 AS Monaco
 Montpellier HSC
 AS Nancy
 FC Nantes Atlantique
 Paris Saint-Germain FC
 Stade Rennais FC
 AS Saint-Étienne
 Sedan
 RC Strasbourg
 Troyes AC

League table

Promoted from Ligue 2, who will play in 2000–01 French Division 1
 Lille OSC: champion of Ligue 2
 EA Guingamp: runners-up
 Toulouse FC: third place

Results

Top goalscorers

Player of the year
The trophy was awarded by the National Union of Professional Footballers to:
 Marcelo Gallardo, AS Monaco

References

External links
France 1999/2000 at Rec.Sport.Soccer Statistics Foundation

Ligue 1 seasons
France
1